Lactobacillus crispatus is a common, rod-shaped species of genus Lactobacillus and is a hydrogen peroxide (H2O2) producing beneficial microbiota species located in both the vagina, through vaginal discharge, and the vertebrate gastrointestinal tract. The strain CTV-05 is used as a probiotic that can be used by premenopausal and postmenopausal women that experience recurrent urinary tract infections. It is being evaluated specifically for the prevention and treatment of bacterial vaginosis, which is characterized by the absence of Lactobacillus flora necessary to protect the host from infection.

History
The species name derives from Latin , meaning "curled", referring to the shape of the bacteria. L. crispatus was first isolated in 1953 by Brygoo and Aladame, who proposed it as a new species of the genus Eubacterium. In the 1970s the type strain VPI 3199 (ATCC 33820) of L. crispatus (at the time still designated "Eubacterium crispatum") was deposited in the collection of the Anaerobe Laboratory, Virginia Polytechnic Institute and State University (VPI), where it was identified as a Lactobacillus and characterized by Moore and Holdeman. Addressing the problem of genetic heterogeneity among a vast number of strains identified as L. acidophilus based on phenotypic similarity, Johnson et al. performed DNA homology experiments on 89 previously proposed L. acidophilus strains and delineated six distinct homology groups. Only the strains pertaining to DNA homology group A1 were still designated L. acidophilus. Strains in the homology groups A2, A3, A4, B1 and B2 were proposed to be distinct species and later reclassified as L. crispatus, L. amylovorus, L. gallinarum, L. gasseri and L.  johnsonii respectively. In the case of L. crispatus this happened in 1983 as Cato and her coworkers recharacterized strain VPI 3199 and discovered 100% DNA homology with VPI 7635 (ATCC 33197), the type strain of "L. acidophilus" group A2.

Taxonomy
It is a species in the phylum Bacillota, in the class Bacilli, in the order Lactobacillales, in the family Lactobacillaceae and the genus Lactobacillus. It is one of 122 other species identified within the genus.

Genome
Even within L. crispatus there is substantial genetic variation: strains of L. crispatus have genome sizes ranging from 1.83 to 2.7 Mb, and encode 1,839 (EM-LC1) to 2,688 (FB077-07) proteins.

The genome of Lactobacillus crispatus strain ST1, which colonizes chicken, consists of about 2,043,161 nucleotides and encodes 2,024 proteins, 76 RNA genes and has a circular chromosomal shape.

Ecology
The strain of Lactobacillus crispastus was originally isolated from a pouch in a chicken gullet and is considered to be one of the strongest H2O2-producing lactobacilli. Like many other Lactobacillus species, it can be severely altered by changes to the immune system, hormone levels and from the use of antimicrobials. Lactobacillus crispatus is a normal inhabitant of the lower reproductive tract in healthy women.

Probiotic use

CTV-05 gelatin suppository capsules (LACTIN-V) are inserted into the vagina as a probiotic that can help maintain healthy flora. Studies have shown that L. crispastus CTV-05 effectively colonized the vagina and helped prevent and treat recurrent bacterial vaginosis and other genital infections. Scientists have stated that evidence from clinical trials suggests that these probiotics will safely and effectively treat bacterial vaginosis if used alone or alongside an antibiotic treatment if an infection had already arisen.

Condom use has showed increased colonization of Lactobacillus crispatus in the vagina because it protects against both bacterial vaginosis (BV) and human immunodeficiency virus (HIV).

References

External links
Type strain of Lactobacillus crispatus at BacDive -  the Bacterial Diversity Metadatabase
https://www.micropia.nl/en/discover/news/2019/5/27/A-healthy-vagina-with-Lactobacillus-crispatus-bacteria/

Lactobacillaceae
Probiotics